Kawkab (in Arabic: كوكب) is a village in south-western Yemen. It is located in the Abyan Governorate. Kawkab means "planet" in Arabic.

External links
Towns and villages in the Abyan Governorate

Populated places in Abyan Governorate
Villages in Yemen